Achtung! Auto-Diebe! is a 1930 German crime film directed by Harry Piel and written by Hans Rameau. The film starred Harry Piel and Leopold von Ledebur.

Cast
Harry Piel as Harry Palen, Auto-Verkäufer
and in alphabetical order
Charly Berger
Hugo Fischer-Köppe as Franz, Chauffeur
Charles Francois
Max Gülstorff as Jakob Reuß, Inhaber einer Auto-Firma
Dary Holm as Helene, seine Gattin
Herbert Paulmüller
Lydia Potechina
Oswald Scheffel
Raimondo Van Riel as Robert Radek
Leopold von Ledebur as  Eggert, Kriminalkommissär

Release
The film premiered on 5 June 1930 in Berlin.

External links
 

1930 films
Films of the Weimar Republic
1930s German-language films
German black-and-white films
1930 crime films
Films directed by Harry Piel
German crime films
1930s German films